This is a list of heritage, private and preserved railways throughout the United Kingdom, the Crown dependencies, and British Overseas Territories whether operational or closed, that are operated for charitable purposes or shareholder profit. Some also provide economic local transport. For rail museums, see List of British railway museums.

Many of the standard-gauge railways listed, including former branch lines and ex-mainline routes, were closed by British Railways under the Beeching Axe of the 1960s. Most have been restored and operate as heritage lines. A smaller number of lines were formerly industrial or colliery railways.

Many of these preserved railways are mentioned in national and international tour guides, and visits may form part of a school curriculum or feature in other studies, including civil engineering, mechanics, social, economic and political history, visual arts and drama.

This list also includes tramways. Nearly all tram services in Britain ended in the 1950s and early 1960s, leaving just Blackpool Corporation Tramways, although some big cities have since revived them in the late 20th century onwards.

England

East of England

Standard gauge
 Colne Valley Railway, Castle Hedingham, Essex
 Epping Ongar Railway, Ongar, Essex
 Mid-Norfolk Railway, Dereham, Norfolk
 Mid Suffolk Light Railway, Brockford, Suffolk
 Nene Valley Railway, Wansford, Cambridgeshire
 North Norfolk Railway, Sheringham, Norfolk

Railway centres and museums
 Bressingham Steam and Gardens, Diss, Norfolk
 East Anglian Railway Museum, Chappel & Wakes Colne Station, Essex
 Mangapps Railway Museum, Burnham-on-Crouch, Essex
 Railworld Wildlife Haven, Peterborough, Cambridgeshire
 Whitwell & Reepham Railway, Reepham, Norfolk

Narrow gauge
 Bressingham Steam and Gardens, Diss, Norfolk
 Great Whipsnade Railway, ZSL Whipsnade Zoo, Bedfordshire
 Leighton Buzzard Light Railway, Bedfordshire
 Southend Pier Railway, Southend-on-Sea, Essex
 Waltham Abbey Royal Gunpowder Mills, Essex
 Yaxham Light Railway, Norfolk – private site

Miniature gauge

 Audley End Railway, Essex
 Bure Valley Railway, Aylsham, Norfolk
 Bushey Miniature Railway, Bushey, Hertfordshire
 East Herts Miniature Railway, Ware, Hertfordshire
 Eaton Park Miniature Railway, Norwich, Norfolk
 Fancott Miniature Railway, Bedfordshire
 Rex Express, Paradise Wildlife Park, Hertfordshire
 Great Woburn Railway, Woburn, Bedfordshire
 Museum of Power, Langford, Essex
 Wells & Walsingham Light Railway, Wells-next-the-Sea, Norfolk
 Wells Harbour Railway, Wells-next-the-Sea, Norfolk

Tramways
 East Anglia Transport Museum, Lowestoft, Suffolk

East Midlands

Standard gauge
 Battlefield Line, Shackerstone, Leicestershire
 Ecclesbourne Valley Railway, Wirksworth, Derbyshire
 Great Central Railway, Loughborough, Leicestershire
 Lincolnshire Wolds Railway, Ludborough, Lincolnshire
 Midland Railway – Butterley, Derbyshire
 Northampton & Lamport Railway, Pitsford and Brampton, Northamptonshire
 Northants Ironstone Railway, Hunsbury Hill, Northamptonshire
 Nottingham Heritage Railway, Ruddington, Nottinghamshire
 Peak Rail, Matlock, Derbyshire
 Rushden, Higham & Wellingborough Railway, Rushden, Northamptonshire

Railway centres and museums
 Appleby Frodingham Railway, Scunthorpe, Lincolnshire
 Barrow Hill Railway Centre, Barrow Hill nr Chesterfield, Derbyshire
 Nottingham Heritage Railway, Ruddington, Nottinghamshire
 Rushden Transport Museum, Northamptonshire
 Rutland Railway Museum, Cottesmore, Rutland

Narrow gauge
 Billing Aquadrome Miniature Railway, Great Billing, Northamptonshire
 Crowle Peatland Railway, Crowle, North Lincolnshire
 Derbyshire Dales Narrow Gauge Railway, Rowsley, Derbyshire
 Golden Valley Light Railway, Butterley, Derbyshire
 Greenlea Light Railway, Burbage, Leicestershire - private site
 Irchester Narrow Gauge Railway Museum, Irchester, Wellingborough, Northamptonshire
 Lincolnshire Coast Light Railway, Skegness, Lincolnshire
 North Ings Farm Railway, Lincolnshire
 Steeple Grange Light Railway, Wirksworth, Derbyshire
 Wicksteed Park Railway, Kettering, Northamptonshire

Miniature gauge
 Cleethorpes Coast Light Railway, Lincolnshire
 Mablethorpe Miniature Railway, Queens Park, Mablethorpe, Lincolnshire
 Stapleford Miniature Railway, near Melton Mowbray, Leicestershire

Tramways

 National Tramway Museum, Crich, Derbyshire

North England

Standard gauge
 Aln Valley Railway, Alnwick, Northumberland
 Bowes Railway, Tyne and Wear
 Derwent Valley Light Railway, Murton, North Yorkshire
 East Lancashire Railway, Bury, Greater Manchester
 Eden Valley Railway, Warcop, Cumbria
 Elsecar Heritage Railway, South Yorkshire
 Embsay and Bolton Abbey Steam Railway, Embsay, North Yorkshire
 Keighley & Worth Valley Railway, Haworth, West Yorkshire
 Lakeside & Haverthwaite Railway, Haverthwaite, nr Staveley, Cumbria
 Middleton Railway, Hunslet, West Yorkshire
 North Tyneside Steam Railway, North Shields, Tyne and Wear
 North Yorkshire Moors Railway, Pickering, North Yorkshire
 Ribble Steam Railway, Preston, Lancashire
 Stainmore Railway, Kirkby Stephen, Cumbria
 Tanfield Railway, Marley Hill, County Durham
 Weardale Railway, Stanhope, County Durham
 Wensleydale Railway, Leeming Bar, North Yorkshire
 Yorkshire Wolds Railway, Sledmere–Fimber, East Yorkshire

Railway centres and museums
 Beamish Museum & Railway Centre, County Durham
 Carnforth Railway Centre, Carnforth, Lancashire
 Crewe Heritage Centre, Crewe, Cheshire
 Head of Steam, Darlington, County Durham
 Haig Colliery Mining Museum, Cumbria
 Leeds Industrial Museum, Armley, West Yorkshire
 Locomotion, Shildon, County Durham
 Monkwearmouth Station Museum, Sunderland (closed 2016)
 National Railway Museum, York, North Yorkshire
 South Yorkshire Transport Museum, Aldwarke, Rotherham, South Yorkshire
 Stephenson Railway Museum, West Chirton, Tyne and Wear

Narrow gauge

 Eaton Hall Railway, Cheshire – private site
 Heatherslaw Light Railway, Northumberland
 South Tynedale Railway between Alston, Cumbria and Slaggyford, Northumberland
 Threlkeld Quarry and Mining Railway, Cumbria
 West Lancashire Light Railway, Hesketh Bank, Lancashire
 Woodhorn Narrow Gauge Railway, Ashington, Northumberland

Miniature gauge

 All in one Miniature Railway, Knutsford nr Allostock, Cheshire
 Blackpool Zoo Railway, Blackpool, Lancashire
 Brookside Miniature Railway, Poynton, Cheshire
 Dragon Miniature Railway, Marple, nr Stockport, Greater Manchester
 High Legh Miniature Railway, High Legh, Cheshire
 Whistlestop Valley, Clayton West, West Yorkshire
 Knowsley Safari Park Railway, Knowsley, Merseyside
 Halton Miniature Railway, Runcorn, Cheshire
 Lakeside Miniature Railway, Pleasureland Southport, Merseyside
 North Bay Railway, Scarborough, North Yorkshire
 Pleasure Beach Express, Blackpool Pleasure Beach, Lancashire
 Pugneys Light Railway, Wakefield, West Yorkshire
 Ravenglass & Eskdale Railway, Cumbria
 Wirral Model Engineering Society, Royden Park, Wirral, Merseyside
 Saltburn Miniature Railway, Saltburn, North Yorkshire
 South Park Miniature Railway, Cheadle Hulme, Greater Manchester
 Teesside Small Gauge Railway, Preston Park, Stockton-on-Tees
 Walton Park Miniature Railway, Sale, Greater Manchester
 Windmill Farm Railway, Bursough, Lancashire

Tramways

 Beamish Museum, County Durham
 Bradford Industrial Museum, Eccleshill, (nr Bradford), West Yorkshire
 Heaton Park Tramway, Manchester, Greater Manchester
 Shipley Glen Tramway, Shipley, West Yorkshire
 Wirral Transport Museum and Heritage Tramway, Birkenhead, Merseyside

South East

Standard gauge
 Bluebell Railway, Sheffield Park, Sussex
 Chinnor & Princes Risborough Railway, Chinnor, Oxfordshire / Princes Risborough, Buckinghamshire
 Cholsey & Wallingford Railway, Wallingford, Oxfordshire
 East Kent Railway, Shepherdswell, Kent
 Isle of Wight Steam Railway, Havenstreet, Isle of Wight
 Kent & East Sussex Steam Railway, Tenterden, Kent
 Lavender Line, Isfield, East Sussex
 Watercress Line, New Alresford, Hampshire
 Rother Valley Railway, Robertsbridge, East Sussex (land purchases in progress)
 Spa Valley Railway, Royal Tunbridge Wells, Kent

Railway centres and museums

 Buckinghamshire Railway Centre, Quainton, Aylesbury, Buckinghamshire
 Chatham Historic Dockyard Railway, Kent
 Didcot Railway Centre, Didcot, Oxfordshire
 Finmere railway station, Buckinghamshire (private site)
 London Transport Museum, Covent Garden, Central London
 Southall Railway Centre, Southall, West London

Narrow gauge

 Amberley Museum Railway, Amberley, West Sussex
 Great Bush Railway, Tinkers Park, Hadlow Down, East Sussex
 Bredgar & Wormshill Light Railway, near Sittingbourne, Kent
 Exbury Gardens Railway, Beaulieu, Hampshire
 Hayling Seaside Railway, Hayling Island, Hampshire
 Hollycombe Steam Collection, near Liphook, Hampshire
 Hythe Pier Ferry Railway, Hampshire
 Old Kiln Light Railway, Rural Life Centre, Reeds Road, Tilford, Farnham, Surrey
 Hampton & Kempton Waterworks Railway, Hanworth/Hampton, London.
 London Museum of Water & Steam, Kew Bridge, Brentford, London
 Mail Rail, short section of the former London Post Office Railway opened to public since 2017
 Romney, Hythe & Dymchurch Railway, Kent
 Sittingbourne & Kemsley Light Railway, Kent
 Volk's Electric Railway, Brighton, East Sussex

Miniature gauge
 Bekonscot Light Railway, Beaconsfield, Buckinghamshire
 Blenheim Park Railway, Blenheim Palace, Oxfordshire
 Beech Hurst Park Miniature Railway, Haywards Heath, West Sussex
 Crowborough Miniature Railway, Crowborough, East Sussex
 Eastleigh Lakeside Steam Railway, Hampshire
 Frimley Lodge Park Railway, Surrey
 Great Cockcrow Railway, Chertsey, Surrey
 Harlington Locomotive Society, Hayes, Middlesex
 Hastings Miniature Railway, Hastings Seafront, East Sussex
 Ickenham Miniature Railway, Ickenham, London
 Malden District Society of Model Engineers, Thames Ditton, Surrey
 Moors Valley Railway, near Ringwood, Hampshire
 Reading Society of Model Engineers, Reading Berkshire
 Royal Victoria Railway, Southampton, Hampshire
 Ruislip Lido Railway, Ruislip, London
 South Downs Light Railway, Pulborough, West Sussex
 Watford Miniature Railway, Cassiobury Park, Watford, Hertfordshire
 Woking Miniature Railway, Knaphill, Surrey

South West

Standard gauge
 Avon Valley Railway, Bitton, Gloucestershire
 Bideford Railway Heritage Centre, Bideford, Devon
 Bodmin & Wenford Railway, Bodmin, Cornwall
 Dartmouth Steam Railway, Paignton, Devon
 Dean Forest Railway, Norchard, Gloucestershire
 East Somerset Railway, Cranmore, Somerset
 Helston Railway, Prospidnick, Cornwall
 Plym Valley Railway, Marsh Mills, Plympton, Devon
 Shillingstone Railway Project, Shillingstone, Dorset
 Somerset & Dorset Railway, Midsomer Norton, Somerset
 South Devon Railway, Buckfastleigh, Devon
 Swanage Railway, Swanage, Dorset
 Swindon & Cricklade Railway, Blunsdon, Wiltshire
 West Somerset Railway, Minehead, Somerset

Railway centres and museums
 Bristol Harbour Railway, Bristol
 Steam – Museum of the Great Western Railway, Swindon, Wiltshire
 Yeovil Railway Centre, Yeovil, Somerset

Narrow gauge

 Bicton Woodland Railway, Devon
 Devon Railway Centre, Bickleigh, Devon
 Exmoor Steam Railway, Devon – private site
 Gartell Light Railway, Templecombe, Somerset
 Launceston Steam Railway, Launceston, Cornwall
 Lea Bailey Light Railway. Gloucestershire / Herefordshire border
 Lynbarn Railway, Devon
 Lynton & Barnstaple Railway, Woody Bay, Devon
 Morwellham Quay Open Air Museum, Devon

 Westonzoyland Pumping Station Museum, Somerset

Miniature gauge

 Beer Heights Light Railway, Devon
 Berkeley Light Railway, Gloucestershire
 Exmouth Miniature Railway, Devon
 Gorse Blossom Farm Railway, Devon
 Lappa Valley Steam Railway, Cornwall
 Longleat Railway, Wiltshire
 Moors Valley Railway, Ashley Heath, Dorset
 Perrygrove Railway, Coleford, Gloucestershire
 Porterswick Junction Light Railway, Cornwall
 Bickington Steam Railway, Trago Mills, Devon

Tramways
 Seaton Tramway, Seaton, Devon

West Midlands

Standard gauge
 Cambrian Heritage Railways, Oswestry and Llynclys, Shropshire
 Chasewater Railway, Chasewater Country Park, Brownhills, Staffordshire
 Churnet Valley Railway, Cheddleton, Staffordshire
 Foxfield Light Railway, Blythe Bridge, Staffordshire
 Gloucestershire Warwickshire Railway, Toddington, Gloucestershire and Broadway, Worcestershire
 Severn Valley Railway, Bridgnorth, Shropshire
 Telford Steam Railway, Horsehay, Shropshire

Railway centres and museums
 Coleford Great Western Railway Museum, Coleford, Gloucestershire
 Tyseley Railway Centre, Tyseley, Warwickshire
 Winchcombe Railway Museum, Winchcombe, Gloucestershire

Narrow gauge
 Amerton Railway, Staffordshire
 Apedale Valley Light Railway, Chesterton, Newcastle Under Lyme, Staffordshire
 Bromyard and Linton Light Railway, Bromyard, Herefordshire – private site
 Moseley Railway Trust, Chesterton, Newcastle-under-Lyme, Staffordshire
 North Gloucestershire Railway, Toddington, Gloucestershire
 Perrygrove Railway, Gloucestershire
 Rudyard Lake Steam Railway, Rudyard, Staffordshire
 Statfold Barn Railway, Tamworth, Staffordshire – private site

Miniature gauge
 Broomy Hill Railway, Herefordshire
 Downs Light Railway, Colwall, Worcestershire (also the oldest private miniature railway worldwide)
 Echills Wood Railway, Kingsbury Waterpark, Warwickshire
 Evesham Vale Light Railway, Evesham Country Park, Worcestershire
 Weston Park Railway, Shropshire

Tramways

 Black Country Living Museum, Dudley, West Midlands

Proposed

East of England
 Leiston Works Railway, Leiston, Suffolk (currently under construction)
 Southwold Railway, Southwold, Suffolk
 Wisbech and March Railway, Waldersea, Cambridgeshire

North of England
 Poulton and Wyre Railway, Thornton–Cleveleys, Lancashire (under restoration)

South of England
 Combe Rail, Mortehoe-Woolacombe, Devon
 Remembrance Line, Folkestone, Kent
 North Somerset Railway, Radstock, Somerset
 Shillingstone Railway Project, Shillingstone, Dorset (under construction)
 Tarka Valley Railway, Torrington, Devon (display museum at former station house, public house only)
 Vale of Berkeley Railway, Sharpness, Gloucestershire

Defunct
 Ashford Steam Centre, Willesborough, Kent – closed in 1976.
 Abbey Light Railway, Kirkstall, West Yorkshire – closed in 2012.
 Brockham Railway Museum, Dorking, Surrey – closed 1982 (Stock moved to Amberley Museum Railway, West Sussex)
 Bolebroke Castle Miniature Railway, East Sussex – closed 2012
 Buxton Steam Centre, Derbyshire – closed in 1987, as Peak Rail moved to Darley Dale.
 Cadeby Light Railway, Cadeby, Leicestershire – closed in 2005.
 Chester Zoo monorail, Chester Zoo, Chester
 Creekmoor Light Railway, Poole, Dorset – closed in 1973
 Dinting Railway Centre, Derbyshire – closed in 1991, (Society moved to Ingrow (West) station on the KWVR, West Yorkshire.)
 Dowty Railway Centre, Ashchurch, Gloucestershire – closed in the 1980s
 Eastbourne Tramway, East Sussex – closed 1969, (moved to Seaton, Devon)
 Electric Railway Museum, Warwickshire - closed in October 2017, (rolling stock relocated to other preserved railways across the UK).
 Great Yorkshire Railway Preservation Society, Starbeck, North Yorkshire – closed in 1989 (Group moved to Murton, near York, to restore part of the former Derwent Valley Light Railway)
 Lincolnshire Coast Light Railway, Humberston, Lincolnshire – closed 1985 - Rebuilt 2009 in Skegness.
 Markeaton Park Light Railway, Rowsley, Derbyshire - closed in 2016, track lifted in 2017.
 Marwell Wildlife Railway, Hampshire - closed in 2021 and track lifted by end of 2022.
 Museum of British Transport, Clapham, South London – closed in 1973. Some exhibits moved first to Syon Park, West London and subsequently to Covent Garden to form London Transport Museum. Some exhibits moved to N.R.M. York.
 North Downs Steam Railway, Dartford, Kent – closed in 1995 (society merged with Spa Valley Railway)
 North Woolwich Old Station Museum, East London – closed in 2008
 Queen Mary's Hospital Miniature Railway, Carshalton, South London - Closed in 1997
 Ramsgate Tunnel Railway, Ramsgate, Kent – closed in 1965
 Snibston Railway, Coalville, Leicestershire – closed on 31 July 2015 (as with the Discovery Museum, itself)
 Southport Pier Tramway, Southport, Merseyside - closed 2015
 Southport Railway Museum, Southport, Lancashire – closed in 1999 (Society moved to Preston Docks as the Ribble Steam Railway).
 Stevington & Turvey Light Railway, Turvey, Bedfordshire – private site - closed in 2014.
 Transperience, Low Moor, Bradford, Yorkshire – closed in 1997
 Westerham Valley Railway Association, Westerham, Kent – closed 1965 (merged with Kent and East Sussex Railway Preservation Society with a few items of stock transferred to KWVR.)

Northern Ireland
See List of heritage railways in Northern Ireland

Irish standard gauge
 Downpatrick and County Down Railway, County Down

Railway centres and museums
 Whitehead Railway Museum, Whitehead, County Antrim
 Ulster Folk and Transport Museum, Cultra, County Down

Narrow gauge
 Foyle Valley Railway, County Londonderry
 Giant's Causeway and Bushmills Railway, County Antrim
 Peatlands Park Railway, County Armagh

Defunct
 Shane's Castle Railway, County Antrim – closed 1994 (stock moved to Giants Causeway and Bushmills Railway.)

Scotland

Standard gauge

Central Highlands
 Keith & Dufftown Railway, Dufftown, Banffshire and Keith, Morayshire
 Strathspey Railway, Aviemore, Highland

East Coast of Scotland
 Bo'ness & Kinneil Railway, Bo'ness, Falkirk
 Fife Heritage Railway, Leven, Fife
 Caledonian Railway, Brechin, Angus
 Royal Deeside Railway, Milton of Crathes, Aberdeenshire

Scottish Borders
 Waverley Route Heritage Association, Whitrope, Roxburghshire

Railway centres and museums
 Doon Valley Railway, Dunaskin - Waterside, East Ayrshire 
 Ferryhill Railway Heritage Trust
 Glasgow Museum of Transport
 Invergarry & Fort Augustus Railway Museum
 Lathalmond Railway Museum, Lathalmond, Fife

Narrow gauge

 Alford Valley Railway, Alford, Aberdeenshire
 Leadhills and Wanlockhead Railway, South Lanarkshire

Miniature railways
 Craigtoun Miniature Railway, St Andrews, Fife
 Ness Islands Railway, Inverness
 Vogrie Park Miniature Railway, Gorebridge, nr Edinburgh
 Strathaven Miniature Railway , Strathaven , South Lanarkshire

Tramways
 Summerlee Heritage Park, Coatbridge, North Lanarkshire

Proposed
 North East of Scotland Railway
 Farming and Railway Visiting Centre, Fife (under construction)

Defunct
 Isle of Mull Railway, Inner Hebrides – closed in 2011.
 Kerr's Miniature Railway, Arbroath - closed in 2020.
 Lochty Private Railway, Fife – closed in 1992.
 Sanday Light Railway, Braeswick, Orkney – closed in 2006.

Wales

North Wales

Mid Wales

South Wales

Proposed

North Wales

Standard gauge
 Dolgarrog Railway, Conwy (under construction)
 Bala & Ffestiniog Railway Heritage Trust, Maentwrog Road, Gwynedd (currently under restoration)

Narrow gauge
 Glyn Valley Tramway, Chirk, Denbighshire

South Wales

Standard gauge
 Garw Valley Railway, Pontycymer, Bridgend
 Maerdy Heritage Railway, Maerdy, Rhondda Cynon Taf

Defunct
 Butetown Historical Railway Society, Cardiff Bay – closed in 1997, moved to Barry Tourist Railway
 Caerphilly Railway Society, Caerphilly Railway Works – closed 1996, moved to Gwili Railway
 Gloddfa Ganol, Blaenau Ffestiniog - museum of narrow-gauge railways, closed in 1998, stock sold at auction
 Swansea Vale Railway, Pentrechwyth – closed in 2009, (most of the track and rolling stock are now located on the Gwili Railway).
 Penrhyn Quarry Railway, Bethesda, Gwynedd
 Trawsfynydd and Blaenau Ffestiniog Railway, Closed and replaced by Bala & Ffestiniog Railway Heritage Trust

Crown dependencies

Isle of Man

Derelict
 Queen's Pier Tramway, Ramsey
 Second Falcon Cliff lift, Douglas
See Rail transport in the Isle of Man.

Channel Islands
 Alderney Railway, Alderney
 Pallot Heritage Steam Museum, Jersey

British Overseas Territories

Falkland Islands
 Camber Railway, Stanley (defunct)

See also

 British narrow-gauge railways
 British Rail
 Conservation in the United Kingdom
 List of closed railway lines in Great Britain
 List of Conservation topics
 List of funicular railways
 List of heritage railways
 List of heritage railways in the Republic of Ireland
 List of railway companies
 List of Yorkshire railways
 Mainline steam trains in Great Britain
 Mountain railway
 Rail transport in the United Kingdom
 Railways in Norfolk
 Railways of Shropshire
 Ridable miniature railway

References

External links
 International Working Steam
 Heritage Railways Directory
 National Preservation forum
 Britains Great Little Railways
 Waverley Route

List
British heritage and private railways
Heritage and private railways